Weston Lakes is a city in Fort Bend County, Texas, United States, within Greater Houston. Residents voted to incorporate the community in an election held on May 10, 2008. At the time of incorporation, there were about 2,300 residents living in Weston Lakes. The population was 3,853 as of the 2020 census.

Geography
Weston Lakes is located along FM 1093, between the cities of Fulshear and Simonton in northern Fort Bend County. The Brazos River forms the southern and part of the eastern boundary of the city.

Demographics

As of the 2020 United States census, there were 3,853 people, 1,345 households, and 1,228 families residing in the city.

Incorporation
With the rapid population growth across Fort Bend County, particularly in the nearby city of Fulshear, some Weston Lakes residents felt that incorporation was the only way to prevent the community from eventually being annexed by Fulshear or another municipality.

The incorporation vote took place on May 10, 2008. Of the 977 valid votes cast, 569 (58.24%) were in favor of incorporation and 408 (41.76%) were opposed. Voter participation was high with slightly over 74 percent of those eligible casting ballots. On May 20, 2008, members of the Fort Bend County Commissioners Court voted to record the results of the election, officially incorporating Weston Lakes as a municipality.

Fort Bend County confirmed that a protest of the incorporation of Weston Lakes has been made. The lawsuit charges that the May incorporation vote was flawed due to a combination of alleged deficiencies in Texas law and its policies, as well as alleged violations of law by the Fort Bend County government and the Weston Lakes Property Owners Association.

The first municipal election took place on November 4, 2008. A total of fifteen candidates competed for six Alderman positions. Mary Rose Zdunkewicz, a 21-year Weston Lakes resident who served on the Lamar Consolidated ISD school board for twelve years during the 1970s and 1980s, was designated the city's first mayor because she received the most votes (561) among the candidates. The five candidates immediately trailing Zdunkewicz – Clifton H. Aldrich (504), Gary L. Owens (486), Denis Deluca (472), Trent Thomas (435), and Ted Case II (419) – will each serve on the city council as Aldermen. The position of city marshal was won by Ron Horowitz who ran unopposed.

Government and infrastructure
Fort Bend County does not have a hospital district. OakBend Medical Center serves as the county's charity hospital which the county contracts with.

Education

Weston Lakes is served by the Lamar Consolidated Independent School District. Students attend Morgan Elementary (Grades Pre K–5), Leaman Junior High (Grades 6–8), and Fulshear High School (Grades 9–12).

It was previously zoned to Foster High School.

Simonton Christian Academy is located in nearby Simonton.

References

External links

City of Weston Lakes official website

Cities in Texas
Cities in Fort Bend County, Texas
Greater Houston
Populated places established in 2008
Gated communities in Texas